The Roman Catholic Archdiocese of Beira is the Metropolitan See for the Ecclesiastical province of Beira in Mozambique.

History
 4 September 1940: Established as Diocese of Beira from the Territorial Prelature of Mozambique 
 4 June 1984: Promoted as Metropolitan Archdiocese of Beira

Special churches
The seat of the archbishop is Catedral Metropolitana de Nossa Senhora de Rosario (Cathedral Church of Our Lady of the Rosary) in Beira.

Bishops
 Bishops of Beira (Roman rite) 
 Bishop Sebastião Soares de Resende (21 April 1943 – 25 January 1967)
 Bishop Manuel Ferreira Cabral (3 July 1967 – 1 July 1971)
 Bishop Altino Ribeiro de Santana (1972 – 27 February 1973)
 Bishop Ernesto Gonçalves Costa, O.F.M. (23 December 1974 – 3 December 1976)
 Bishop Jaime Pedro Gonçalves (3 December 1976 – 4 June 1984 see below)
 Metropolitan Archbishops of Beira (Roman rite)
 Archbishop Jaime Pedro Gonçalves (see below 4 June 1984 – 14 January 2012)
 Archbishop Claudio Dalla Zuanna, S.C.I. (29 June 2012 – present); formerly, Vicar General of the Dehonians

Coadjutor Bishop
Jaime Pedro Gonçalves (1975-1976)

Auxiliary Bishop
Francisco João Silota, M. Afr. (1988-1990), appointed Bishop of Chimoio

Other priest of this diocese who became bishop
Francisco Nunes Teixeira, appointed Bishop of Quelimane in 1955

Suffragan dioceses
 Chimoio
 Quelimane
 Tete

See also
Roman Catholicism in Mozambique
List of Roman Catholic dioceses in Mozambique

Sources
 GCatholic.org

 Arquidiocese da Beira. Resenha Histórica, Beira: Archdiocese of Beira, 1988

Beira
Beira, Mozambique
1940 establishments in Mozambique
 
A